Francis Haffey (born 28 November 1938) is a Scottish former footballer who played as a goalkeeper for Celtic and the Scottish national team.

Career
Remembered as one of Celtic's great and more eccentric keepers, Haffey made 201 appearances for the club in major competitions. He had 61 clean-sheets and was first-choice goalkeeper for five seasons but did not win any trophies apart from one minor Glasgow Cup in 1961–62, finishing on the losing side in the Scottish Cup finals of 1961 and 1963, both of which went to a replay.

After breaking an ankle in the Glasgow Cup against Partick Thistle in November 1963, effectively ending his Celtic career, he left the following October to play for Swindon Town. Soon thereafter, Haffey moved to Australia, where after a five-year spell as a footballer there he found his way into the entertainment business as a cabaret singer, and later operated a goalkeeping centre on the Gold Coast, Queensland.

International
On his full international debut Haffey saved a Bobby Charlton penalty in a 1–1 home draw versus England in 1960. In 1961, his second and final cap was also versus England. At Wembley, the inexperienced Scotland team with 4 debutants averaged less than 6 full caps per player pre-kick off. The game was 5–3 with 12 minutes to go. Scotland lost 9–3. Neither Haffey nor Bert McCann (5 caps) played for Scotland again even though McCann scored. Only one of the 4 debutants that day collected a career total of more than 4 caps meaning 5 of the team ended their international careers with 5 caps or less.

References

External links

Short Article on a Photograph of Haffey
Interview with Haffey from The Scotsman

1938 births
Living people
Footballers from Glasgow
People from Govan
Scottish footballers
Association football goalkeepers
Celtic F.C. players
Swindon Town F.C. players
Scotland international footballers
Scottish expatriate footballers
Scottish Football League players
Expatriate soccer players in Australia
Scottish expatriate sportspeople in Australia
English Football League players